Home (sometimes stylized as HOME) is the second Korean studio album by South Korean singer-songwriter Roy Kim, released and distributed on October 8, 2014 through CJ E&M Music. The album features nine tracks in total, and produced a top-five hit which shares the same name as the title of the album. As of July 2016, Home has sold over 12,000 physical copies and about 800,000 individual track downloads in Kim's native country (see Roy Kim discography).

Background
In February 2014, while Kim was studying at Georgetown University, it was announced that he had signed his exclusive contract with CJ E&M Music and had plans to release his second full-length album in the autumn of that year. In June 2014, Kim confirmed that he had begun working on the album through a handwritten letter to fans, saying "I'm preparing my second album so please just wait a little more!" In September, the album entitled Home was officially announced and given an October release date.

Home involved participation from numerous musicians, including Eric Darken, Dan Needham, Gary Lunn, Marc Urselli, and Sungha Jung.

Release and reception
On September 21, 2014, Kim uploaded an acoustic performance of the song "12 O'Clock" from his debut studio album, Love Love Love (2013), onto his official YouTube channel, stating "2nd album coming real soon. Next full moon" and informing fans of the album's impending release. A teaser image for the album was revealed on September 29, along with a confirmed release date (October 8). The next day, a handwritten image of the album's track list was posted through Kim's Instagram account. On October 2, the official music video teaser for "Home" was released via YouTube.

In prior to the album's release, a lyric video for the song "Nothing Lasts Forever" was uploaded through CJ E&M Music's official YouTube channel. The lyric video, featuring time-lapse footage of auroras, was created in collaboration with South Korean astrophotographer Kwon O-chul. Kim exhibited the video for free at Gwanghwarang, Sejong Center from October 3 to 7.

The entire album was released digitally at 12:00 am KST on October 8, along with the music video for its lead single. Upon release, Home reached number four on the Gaon Weekly Album Chart. As of July 2016, the album has sold over 12,500 copies in Kim's native country.

On October 14, Kim's label surprisingly released a music video for "When Autumn Comes" onto YouTube. The slow one shot music video was directed by music video director Song Won-young, who had also directed the video for the album's title track.

Singles

"Home"
"Home", the album's title track, is the artist's self-penned song. It is a folk tune with the message of consolation through the lyrics of the song, "I see your sad back hidden behind the flashy lights and busy schedules", "When I hear your footsteps, greeting you with a smile", and "Are you feeling sick anywhere? Was it hard? / Don't worry about me, I just need you to be okay / When your heart is aching, when no one is there for you, just come here".

Kim posted a photo he took with his companion dog Sancho, on his Instagram account, stating "This song was written in the perspective of my 14-year-old friend Sancho. I've been happy thanks to him who waits for me and barks at me, at the door of my house whatever happens to me." Kim also stated "As I do, everyone of you might have someone like Sancho. I have nothing but gratitude, hearing people came to know how much such beings mean to them through my music."

The song debuted and peaked at number two on the Gaon Digital Chart. It won the first place on South Korea's televised music shows including Mnet's M! Countdown, and MBC's Show! Music Core, from October 16 to 18, 2014. In Taiwan, "Home" was ranked at number 90 on the Hit FM's Annual Top 100 Singles Chart of that year. Allkpop listed the song's accompanying music video at number six on its list of "Top 50 K-Pop MVs of 2014". As of April 18, 2015, "Home" has sold over half a million digital copies domestically.

Promotion
From October 7 until November 10, 2014, Kim busked in several places with names starting from each letter of the album title.

Kim began promoting his comeback album on various music programs, starting on Mnet's M! Countdown (October 9). He promoted the lead single on M! Countdown, Simply K-Pop (Arirang TV), Music Bank (KBS), Show Champion (MBC Music), Show! Music Core (MBC), Inkigayo (SBS), and The Show (SBS MTV). On KBS's You Hee-yeol's Sketchbook, Kim performed the title track and "When Autumn Comes", alongside his cover of "Lost Stars" popularized through the 2014 film Begin Again.

On September 25, it was announced that Kim would hold his nationwide live tour entitled "2014 ROYKIM LIVE TOUR HOME" from October 25. Starting at the Olympic Hall, Olympic Park, Seoul, he performed in cities including Daegu, Daejeon, Busan, and Changwon until November 2014, to promote the album.

Kim promoted the album also in Taiwan from November 13 to 15, attending at "ROY KIM 2014 HI FIVE Taipei Fan Meeting" held in celebration of the album's release in the country, with his fans exceeding a thousand.

Track listing
English titles are adapted from the iTunes Store, and credits from Naver Music.

Additional notes:
 "Nothing Lasts Forever" was written while Kim was studying in the United States, inspired by his elder sister's message.
 The title of track 6 is an abbreviation of the word "long-distance relationship".

Credits and personnel
Credits are adapted from the album's liner notes.

Locations

 Recorded at Brownstone Studio, Nashville, TN 
 Recorded at Jane's Place Studio, Nashville, TN 
 Recorded at Eastside Sound Studios 
 Recorded at Booming Sound 
 Mixed at Musicabal 
 Mastered at Metropolis Mastering, London

Personnel

 Sang-woo Kim – vocals , lyrics , composer , backing vocals , album artist 
 Ji-chan Jung – arranger , acoustic guitar , keyboard , arranging of string , nylon-string guitar , backing vocals , music producer
 Jun-ho Hong – electric guitar 
 Dan Needham – drum 
 Gary Lunn – bass 
 Eric Darken – percussion 
 New York String Session Orchestra – recording of string 
 Antoine Silverman, Entcho Todorov, Erin Benim, Suzy Perelman, Lisa Matricardi, Hiroko Taguchi, Monica Davis, Meghan Todt – violin
 Jonathan Dinklage, Phil Payton, Chris Cardona – viola
 Richard Locker, Julian Schwartz – cello
 In-young Bak – arranging and conducting of string 
 Dong-ha Kim – trumpet 
 Han-jin Lee – trombone 
 Sungha Jung – acoustic guitar 
 Jae-jung Bak – backing vocals 
 Young-jo Im – arranging of string 
 Seok-jun Ahn – executive producer
 Baeho "Bobby" Shin – recording of drum, bass guitar, and percussion
 David Donghwa Han – recording assistant
 Marc Urselli – recording of string
 Pyung-wook Lee – recording of all vocals, piano, and Sungha Jung's acoustic guitar
 Hyun-jung Go – mixing 
 Stuart Hawkes – mastering

Charts and sales

Weekly charts

Monthly charts

Year-end charts

Sales

Awards and nominations

Annual music awards

Music program awards

Release history

References

External links
 
 
 
 
 Roy Kim's official website 

2014 albums
Roy Kim albums
Stone Music Entertainment albums
Korean-language albums
Warner Music Group albums